The 1992–93 UEFA Champions League first round was the first stage of the competition proper of the 1992–93 UEFA Champions League, and featured 32 teams. It began on 16 September and ended on 9 October 1992. The 16 winners advanced to the second round.

Times are CET/CEST, as listed by UEFA.

Teams
In total, 32 teams participated in the first round: 28 teams which entered in this round, and 4 winners of the preliminary round.

Format
Each tie was played over two legs, with each team playing one leg at home. The team that scored more goals on aggregate over the two legs advanced to the next round. If the aggregate score was level, the away goals rule was applied, i.e. the team that scored more goals away from home over the two legs advanced. If away goals were also equal, then extra time was played. The away goals rule would be again applied after extra time, i.e. if there were goals scored during extra time and the aggregate score was still level, the visiting team advanced by virtue of more away goals scored. If no goals were scored during extra time, the tie was decided by penalty shoot-out.

Draw
The draw for the first round was held on 15 July 1992 in Geneva, Switzerland.

Summary

The first legs were played on 16 September, and the second legs on 30 September 1992. An additional play-off was held on 9 October.

|}

Matches

IFK Göteborg won 3–2 on aggregate.

Lech Poznań won 2–0 on aggregate.

Rangers won 3–0 on aggregate.

3–3 on aggregate. A play-off was played on a neutral ground to determine the winner.

Leeds United won 5–4 on aggregate.

Slovan Bratislava won 4–1 on aggregate.

Milan won 7–0 on aggregate.

Dinamo București won 2–1 on aggregate.

Marseille won 8–0 on aggregate.

Club Brugge won 4–0 on aggregate.

Austria Wien won 5–4 on aggregate.

Sion won 7–2 on aggregate.

Porto won 9–1 on aggregate.

3–3 on aggregate. AEK Athens won on away goals.

PSV Eindhoven won 8–0 on aggregate.

CSKA Moscow won 5–2 on aggregate.

Barcelona won 1–0 on aggregate.

Notes

References

External links

First round
September 1992 sports events in Europe
October 1992 sports events in Europe